Lists of solved missing person cases include:

 List of solved missing person cases: pre-2000
 List of solved missing person cases: post-2000

See also

 List of kidnappings
 List of murder convictions without a body
 List of people who disappeared mysteriously: 1990–present
 List of people who disappeared mysteriously: 1910–1990
 List of people who disappeared mysteriously: pre-1910
 List of unsolved deaths
 Lists of unsolved murders

Lists of unexplained disappearances